The Nursing Interventions Classification (NIC) is a care classification system which describes the activities that nurses perform as a part of the planning phase of the nursing process associated with the creation of a nursing care plan.

The NIC provides a four level hierarchy whose first two levels consists of a list of 433 different interventions, each with a definition in general terms, and then the ground-level list of a variable number of specific activities a nurse could perform to complete the intervention. The second two levels form a taxonomy in which each intervention is grouped into 27 classes, and each class is grouped into six domains.

An intent of this structure is to make it easier for a nurse to select an intervention for the situation, and to use a computer to describe the intervention in terms of standardized labels for classes and domains. Another intent is in each case to make it easy to use a Nursing Minimum Data Set (NMDS).

The terminology is an American Nurses' Association–recognized terminology, which is included in the UMLS, and is HL7 registered.

See also

 Clinical Care Classification System
 Nursing Outcomes Classification
 NANDA
 Nursing care plan
 Nursing diagnosis
 Nursing process
 Nursing care
 Omaha System

References

Clinical procedure classification
Nursing classification
Nursing in the United States
Nursing informatics